The 2011 Leinster Senior Football Championship was that year's installment of the annual Leinster Senior Football Championship held under the auspices of the Leinster GAA. It was won by Dublin who defeated Wexford in the final. Dublin had been level with Kildare in injury time of their semi-final, but a late intervention by Cormac Reilly was enough to see them over the line by a point. Dublin won their 50th Leinster football title, and their sixth in seven years. Pundits lashed them for their lackadaisical approach and described it as having been won in "perhaps the most unconvincing fashion of the lot." Wexford had not won a Leinster football title since 1945.

Wexford entered the All-Ireland Qualifiers but lost their next game, to Limerick. The winning Dublin team received the Delaney Cup, and automatically advanced to the quarter-final stage of the 2011 All-Ireland Senior Football Championship. They went on to win the All-Ireland title, their first in a very very very long time.

Bracket

Preliminary round

Quarter-finals

Semi-finals

Final

References

External links
 Leinster GAA website

2L
Leinster Senior Football Championship